This is a list of association football stadiums in Scotland, ranked in descending order of capacity. The minimum required capacity is 1,000.

Current stadiums

See also 
List of association football stadiums by capacity
List of British stadiums by capacity
List of European stadiums by capacity
List of Scottish Football League stadiums
List of Scottish Professional Football League stadiums
Scottish football attendance records
Scottish stadium moves

References

External links 
 Scottish stadiums guide at footballgroundguide.com

 
 
Stadiums
Lists of sports venues in Scotland
Lists of sports venues with capacity